Marseillan-Plage station (French: Gare de Marseillan-Plage)is a railway station in Marseillan, Hérault, Occitanie, southern France. Within TER Occitanie, it is part of line 21 (Narbonne–Avignon).

References

Railway stations in Hérault
Railway stations in France opened in 1857